Kumudendu Muni was a Digambara monk who authored Siribhoovalaya, a unique multi-lingual literary work. Scholars are divided about when he lived and not much is known about him. It is believed that he was the spiritual teacher of King Amoghavarsha and a disciple of Virasena and Jinasena. He is said to have lived around thousand years ago. Pandit Yellappa Shashtri was the first one to decipher his creation, Siribhoovalaya. Karlamangalam Srikantaiah, the editor of the first edition, claims that the work may have been composed around 800 AD.

Biography
Kumudendu Muni was a Digambara monk who authored Siribhoovalaya, a unique multi-lingual literary work. Scholars are divided about when he lived and not much is known about him. It is believed that he was the spiritual teacher of King Amoghavarsha and a disciple of Virasena and Jinasena. He is said to have lived around thousand years ago. Pandit Yellappa Shashtri was the first one to decipher his creation, Siribhoovalaya. Karlamangalam Srikantaiah, the editor of the first edition, claims that the work may have been composed around 800 AD.

Notes

References

Kannada-language writers
History of Karnataka
Year of death unknown
Year of birth unknown
Indian Jain monks
9th-century Indian Jains
9th-century Jain monks
9th-century Indian monks